Everybody Needs Love may refer to:

Everybody Needs Love (album), a 1967 album by Gladys Knight & the Pips
"Everybody Needs Love" (Marvin Gaye song), 1978
"Everybody Needs Love" (Stephen Bishop song), 1978, from Bish
"Everybody Needs Love" (The Temptations song), 1965, covered by Gladys Knight & the Pips
"Everybody Needs Love", a 1997 song by Seven Day Jesus from the album Seven Day Jesus